Horaismoptera is a genus of beach flies in the family Canacidae.  All known species are Afrotropical or Oriental

Species
H. grisea Séguy, 1933
H. hennigi Sabrosky, 1978
H. microphthalma (Bezzi, 1908)
H. vulpina Hendel, 1907

References

Canacidae
Carnoidea genera
Taxa named by Friedrich Georg Hendel
Diptera of Asia
Diptera of Africa